Hubbardton may refer to:
Hubbardton, Vermont
Battle of Hubbardton – an engagement in the Saratoga campaign of the American Revolutionary War.